Golm station is a railway station in the district of Golm in the city of Potsdam, Brandenburg, Germany.

References

Railway stations in Brandenburg
Railway stations in Germany opened in 1902
1902 establishments in Prussia
Buildings and structures in Potsdam
Transport in Potsdam